Kungliga begravningsplatsen, known in English as the Royal Cemetery, was first used in 1922 and has been the only official burial place of the Swedish Royal Family since 1950, succeeding Riddarholmen Church as such. It takes up all of the small island of Karlsborg in the bay of Brunnsviken. The cemetery is part of the popular Haga Park in Solna, Sweden.

The little bridge from the mainland's park to the island and the large cruciform monument by the highest grave were designed by Ferdinand Boberg.

Burials

Buried at the cemetery
Crown Princess Margareta, Duchess of Scania (1882–1920), first wife of King Gustaf VI Adolf
Prince Gustaf Adolf, Duke of Västerbotten (1906–1947), son of King Gustaf VI Adolf
Prince Carl, Duke of Västergötland (1861–1951), son of King Oscar II
Princess Ingeborg, Duchess of Västergötland (1878–1958), widow of Prince Carl, Duke of Västergötland
Queen Louise of Sweden (1889–1965), second wife of King Gustaf VI Adolf
Princess Sibylla, Duchess of Västerbotten (1908–1972), widow of Prince Gustaf Adolf, Duke of Västerbotten
King Gustaf VI Adolf of Sweden (1882–1973), son of King Gustaf V
Prince Bertil, Duke of Halland (1912–1997), son of King Gustaf VI Adolf
Sigvard Bernadotte, born Prince of Sweden (1907–2002), son of King Gustaf VI Adolf
Prince Carl Bernadotte (1911–2003), son of Prince Carl, Duke of Västergötland
Carl Johan Bernadotte, born Prince of Sweden (1916–2012), son of King Gustaf VI Adolf
Princess Lilian, Duchess of Halland (1915–2013), widow of Prince Bertil, Duke of Halland
Princess Kristine Bernadotte (1932–2014), widow of Prince Carl Bernadotte
Gunnila Bernadotte (1923–2016), widow of Carl Johan Bernadotte

Family buried elsewhere (since 1922)
Queen Victoria of Sweden (1862–1930), wife of King Gustaf V, buried in Riddarholmen Church
Princess Ebba Bernadotte (née Ebba Munck af Fulkila 1858-1946), wife of Prince Oscar Bernadotte, buried at Stockholm's Northern Cemetery in Solna
Prince Eugen, Duke of Närke (1865–1947), son of King Oscar II, ashes buried at Waldemarsudde
King Gustaf V of Sweden (1858–1950), son of King Oscar II, buried in Riddarholmen Church 
Prince Oscar Bernadotte (1859–1953), son of King Oscar II, buried at Stockholm's Northern Cemetery in Solna
Prince Vilhelm, Duke of Södermanland (1884–1965), son of King Gustaf V, buried at Flen Cemetery, Flen, with his daughter-in-law Karin Bernadotte
Lennart Bernadotte, born Prince of Sweden (1909–2004), son of Prince Wilhelm, Duke of Södermanland, buried at Mainau with his second wife Sonja Bernadotte and mother Maria of Russia (former princess of Sweden)

Public access
The island and the public areas of Haga Park are part of Solna's and Stockholm's protected Royal National City Park area. That large park itself is public, open year-round for visitors at no charge; the cemetery is open for visitors May–August (Thursdays 1 P.M. to 3 P.M.).

Gallery

References

External links
Royal Cemetery Swedish Royal Court

Kungliga begravningsplatsen (The Royal Burial Ground)
Buildings and structures in Stockholm County
Tourist attractions in Stockholm County
Kungliga begravningsplatsen
Burial sites of the House of Bernadotte